Shestakovo is a rural locality (a village) in Kichmegnskoye Rural Settlement, Kichmengsko-Gorodetsky District, Vologda Oblast, Russia. The population was 24 as of 2002.

Geography 
Shestakovo is located 31 km northeast of Kichmengsky Gorodok (the district's administrative centre) by road. Kilchenga is the nearest rural locality.

References 

Rural localities in Kichmengsko-Gorodetsky District